The Glasgow Pollok by-election of 9 March 1967 was held after the death of Labour MP (MP) Alex Garrow:

The seat was marginal, having been won by Labour at the 1966 United Kingdom general election by under 2,000 votes.

Candidates
Esmond Wright for the Conservatives was a historian and author
Labour nominated local councillor and campaigner Dick Douglas
The Scottish National Party nominated George Leslie, who had trained as a vet after studying at Glasgow University.
The local Liberal Party association nominated Ian Miller
The Communists chose Alex Murray, their Scottish Secretary

Result of the previous general election

Result of the by-election

Both main parties lost votes compared with the previous general election due to the good showing of the SNP, who recorded what was then their best result in a Glasgow constituency. However, as the Conservatives had predicted, the SNP drew more votes from Labour, allowing Wright to gain the seat with a majority of 2,201. It was the first time the Conservatives had gained a seat in Scotland since the 1959 general election and the party's first by-election gain since the Glasgow Camlachie by-election in 1948. The Glasgow Herald suggested that the result would be claimed as a turning point by the Conservatives in Scotland, while Labour would have to eat "a lot of campaign words", having predicted that they would have an increased majority and that the SNP would lose their deposit. Having almost pushed Labour into third place the result was described by the same newspaper as a "triumph" for the SNP, who had not previously contested the constituency, while the poor showing by the Liberals was labelled "a disaster".

References

By-elections to the Parliament of the United Kingdom in Glasgow constituencies
Glasgow Pollok by-election
Glasgow Pollok by-election
1960s elections in Scotland
1960s in Glasgow
Glasgow Pollok by-election